Jorge Sammir Cruz Campos (born 23 April 1987), commonly known as Sammir, is a Brazilian-Croatian former professional footballer who played as an attacking midfielder. Born in Brazil, Sammir became a naturalized Croatian citizen and has been capped seven times for the Croatia national football team. He was selected for the 2014 FIFA World Cup.

Club career

Brazil
Born in Itabuna, Bahia, Sammir joined Atlético Paranaense's youth setup in 2001, aged 14, after a brief period at Atlético Mineiro. He was promoted to the first-team in February 2004, but failed to make any appearances for the Brazilian club and was subsequently loaned out to Ferroviária.

In December 2005 Sammir joined Paulista also in a temporary deal. After struggling to find his place, he returned to Furacão in April 2006, and was released in August.

In September 2006 Sammir joined Venda Nova, a businessman club, being immediately loaned out to São Caetano. He appeared regularly for the side during his two-month spell.

Dinamo Zagreb
On 6 November 2006 Sammir joined Dinamo Zagreb on loan until the end of the season. He made his debut for the club on 17 March 2007 in a league match against Rijeka.

At the end of the season, Sammir had made eleven league appearances for the club and scored against Slaven Belupo. He also made four appearances in the 2006–07 Croatian Cup. In his first season with the club, Sammir had already won the league and cup title, which was the first of the club's three consecutive doubles they won from 2007 to 2009.

2007–08 season
In the 2007–08 season, his move to Dinamo Zagreb was made permanent as Dinamo Zagreb paid €1.4 million to his former club according to media. Sammir made his European football debut, featuring in all of the club's UEFA Cup and Champions League matches.  He played in the position of right midfielder, swapping positions with the team captain Luka Modrić, playing on the other side of the pitch. It was the club's second season that they had won both the domestic league and cup, Sammir participating in 24 league games, scoring four goals, and 4 cup matches. He made a total of 38 appearances for the club and scored five goals during the course of the season.

2008–09 season
After the departure of Luka Modrić, Sammir was given the number 10 shirt. The club repeated the success from the previous two seasons, clinching the double again in the 2008–09 season. He missed only one league match of the 33 rounds played, scoring 8 goals in the process. He made eleven appearances in UEFA competitions and made five more in the Croatian Cup. Overall making a total of 44 appearances and scoring eleven goals.

2009–10 season
On 16 August, at the start of the 2009–10 season, Sammir scored his first hat–trick for Dinamo in a 5–0 home victory against NK Osijek, converting two penalties and a free kick. The club failed to defend the cup title on that occasion, but won their fifth consecutive league title. Sammir helped with 26 league appearances and five goals. He made six appearances in the 2009–10 Croatian Cup, and featured in all of the club's European matches, playing in all four of the 2009–10 UEFA Champions League matches and in all eight 2009–10 UEFA Europa League matches. Overall, he made 46 appearances and scored six goals for the club.

2010–11 season
At the start of the 2010–11 season Sammir won his first Croatian Supercup with the club as they defeated Hajduk Split by a score 1–0, captain Igor Bišćan scoring the winning goal. Sammir has scored 17 goals in his 28 appearances†. In European competitions he managed to score 7 goals in 12 European matches.

2011–12 season
The Brazilian started the 2011–2012 season, scoring against Cibalia Vinkovci in the Prva HNL, and also the winning goal in the first leg of the Champions League 3rd Qualifying Round tie in a 2–1 win against HJK Helsinki. He scored two goals and setting up another in a 4–1 win against Malmö FF in the first leg of the Champions League Play-off. He appeared in 5 Dinamo games in group stage, playing against Real Madrid, Olympique Lyonnais and AFC Ajax. He continued to appear regularly for the first team in the Prva HNL and the Champions League group stage, netting 8 goals in 32 appearances in all.

2012–13 season
In 2012–2013 season, he scored 8 goals in 7 matches, 6 of which were from the penalty kicks in Prva HNL. He appeared in every match of UEFA Champion's league qualify round, except a guest match against NK Maribor. In May 2011, he was partying at clubs just a few days before the match, which aggravated GNK Dinamo Zagreb's coach Ante Čačić, resulting in club suspension of him and Jerko Leko.. He apologised, rejoined the team, and appeared in all 6 of Dinamo Zagreb
matches in group stage of 2012–13 UEFA Champions League.

Getafe
On 31 January 2014 Sammir signed a three-and-a-half-year with La Liga's Getafe CF. He made his debut in the competition on 1 March, coming on as a second-half substitute in a 0–0 home draw against RCD Espanyol.

Sammir appeared in eight matches as the Madrid outskirts team narrowly avoided relegation. On 24 August 2014 he scored his first goal for the Azulones, but in a 1–3 loss at Celta de Vigo.

Jiangsu Sainty
On 27 February 2015 Sammir moved to China, joining Jiangsu Sainty in a three-year deal. On 15 July 2016, he was loaned to Hangzhou Greentown for half-year.

Sport Recife
In February 2019, Sammir joined Sport Recife, but was released by the club after only few months.

Lokomotiva
In August 2019, he returned once again to Prva HNL, signing for Lokomotiva. On 1 March 2021, Lokomotiva coach Jerko Leko revealed that Sammir and his teammate Nikica Jelavić decided to retire from professional football and that the club respected their decisions.

International career
After appearing for Brazil under-17 and under-18 levels, Sammir expressed his desire to play for the Croatia national football team after holding a Croatian passport. 
On 27 September 2012, Sammir was called to play for Croatia for the games against Wales and Macedonia. He made his debut on 12 October 2012 as a 65th-minute substitute for Nikica Jelavić in the match against Macedonia, a 2–1 win.

He was selected for Croatia's squad for the 2014 FIFA World Cup in his native Brazil, as one of two Brazilian-born players in the squad alongside Eduardo da Silva. Neither played in the opening match against the hosts, but Sammir started the second match, a 4–0 win over Cameroon. He played 72 minutes before being taken off for Mateo Kovačić. After the tournament ended, he did not receive any future call-ups for the national team.

Career statistics

Honours
Dinamo Zagreb
 Croatian First League : 2006-07, 2007–08, 2008–09, 2009–10, 2010–11, 2011–12, 2012–13, 2013–14
 Croatian Cup: 2006–07, 2007–08, 2008–09, 2010–11, 2011–12
 Croatian Super Cup: 2010, 2013

Jiangsu Sainty
 Chinese FA Cup: 2015

Individual
 Prva HNL Player of the Year: 2010
 HNL’s Footballer of the Year: 2010, 2012
 Football Oscar Best Prva HNL player: 2013
 Football Oscar Prva HNL Team of the Year: 2013
 Croatian First Football League: top assist provider 2008-09

References

External links
 
 
 

1987 births
Living people
Croatian footballers
Croatia international footballers
Croatian people of Brazilian descent
Sportspeople from Bahia
Brazilian emigrants to Croatia
Naturalized citizens of Croatia
Brazilian footballers
Association football midfielders
Club Athletico Paranaense players
Paulista Futebol Clube players
Associação Ferroviária de Esportes players
Associação Desportiva São Caetano players
Croatian Football League players
GNK Dinamo Zagreb players
La Liga players
Getafe CF footballers
Chinese Super League players
Jiangsu F.C. players
Zhejiang Professional F.C. players
China League One players
Wuhan F.C. players
NK Lokomotiva Zagreb players
Brazil youth international footballers
2014 FIFA World Cup players
Croatian expatriate footballers
Brazilian expatriate footballers
Brazilian expatriate sportspeople in Spain
Croatian expatriate sportspeople in Spain
Croatian expatriate sportspeople in China
Expatriate footballers in Spain
Expatriate footballers in China
Sport Club do Recife players